The 1908 Marshall Thundering Herd football team represented Marshall College (now Marshall University) in the 1908 college football season. Marshall posted a winless 0–6 record, being outscored by its opposition 14–104.  Home games were played on a campus field called "Central Field" which is presently Campus Commons.

Schedule

References

Marshall
Marshall Thundering Herd football seasons
College football winless seasons
Marshall Thundering Herd football